Fraus basicornis is a moth of the family Hepialidae. It is endemic to Western Australia.

The wingspan is 24–28 mm for males. Adults are on wing from April to May.

References

Moths described in 1989
Hepialidae